Zhanna Pintusevich-Block (Tarnopolskaya; born 6 July 1972) is a Ukrainian former world champion sprinter who competed in the Olympic Games.

Early life
Zhanna Pintusevich-Block comes from a Jewish family. She was born in Nizhyn, Soviet Union and raised by her mother after her father left when she was three. They lived in a one-room house with no running water and used a coal stove for heat. .

Track career
In 1991, Block won the 100 metres and 200 metres at the European Junior Championships, along with a silver in the 4 x 400 metres relay while representing the USSR. In 1992, Block won the European Indoor Championships for 60m and in 1993 won the bronze medal in the same even at the World Championships in Toronto.

She was 1997 World 200m Champion and 2001 World 100m champion. She also won 2 World silvers and 3 European silvers in the sprints. In 2001, she was named Person of the Year in Ukraine for Sports, ahead of former heavyweight champion boxer Wladimir Klitschko and footballer Andriy Shevchenko.

Block was identified by Victor Conte as allegedly having taken illegal performance-enhancing drugs supplied by Conte in the BALCO scandal. In 2011, she was handed a two-year ban from sports for doping violation without a hearing. While never being convicted of using illegal drugs, her results from 30 November 2002 onward were disqualified. Her husband and coach, Mark Block, was given a 10-year ban from sport for receiving performance-enhancing drugs as part of the BALCO scandal.

She took part in the 100 and 200 metres races at both the 1996 Summer Olympics and the 2000 Summer Olympics, reaching the final three times. She also took part in the 100 m and 4 x 100 metres relay at the 2004 Olympics. However, she failed to progress to the finals. She has never won an Olympic medal but she managed to finish in fourth place in the 100 m final in Sydney. Her 100 metres personal best time of 10.82 seconds was set in Edmonton, Alberta, Canada on 6 August 2001.

Personal life
She has been married to her coach, Mark Block, since 1999 and has one daughter. Block posed nude in the September 2004 edition of Playboy in a 'Women of the Olympics' feature.

See also
List of select Jewish track and field athletes

References

1972 births
Living people
Doping cases in athletics
People from Nizhyn
Ukrainian female sprinters
Ukrainian sportspeople in doping cases
Soviet female sprinters
Jewish female athletes (track and field)
Olympic athletes of Ukraine
Athletes (track and field) at the 1996 Summer Olympics
Athletes (track and field) at the 2000 Summer Olympics
Athletes (track and field) at the 2004 Summer Olympics
World Athletics Championships athletes for Ukraine
World Athletics Championships medalists
World Athletics Indoor Championships medalists
European Athletics Championships medalists
Goodwill Games medalists in athletics
Ukrainian Jews
Soviet Jews
Athletes stripped of World Athletics Championships medals
World Athletics Championships winners
Competitors at the 2001 Goodwill Games
Goodwill Games gold medalists in athletics
Olympic female sprinters